Lingleville High School or Lingleville School is a public high school located in Lingleville, Texas (USA) and classified as a 1A school by the UIL. It is part of the Lingleville Independent School District located in northwestern Erath County. In 2013, the school was rated "Met Standard" by the Texas Education Agency.

Athletics
The Lingleville Cardinals compete in the following sports 

Cross Country, Volleyball, 6-Man Football, Basketball, Powerlifting, Tennis & Track

Basketball
Cross Country
6-Man Football
Powerlifting
Tennis
Track and Field
Volleyball

Lingleville recently began playing 6-Man football at the varsity level.

References

External links
Lingleville ISD
List of Six-man football stadiums in Texas

Schools in Erath County, Texas
Public high schools in Texas
Public middle schools in Texas
Public elementary schools in Texas